The Llobregat is a river in Catalonia, Spain.

Llobregat may also refer to:

Places in Spain
 Baix Llobregat, a comarca (county)
 Cornellà de Llobregat, a municipality 
 Esplugues de Llobregat, a municipality 
 El Prat de Llobregat, a municipality 
 L'Hospitalet de Llobregat, a municipality
 Sant Boi de Llobregat, a municipality

Other uses
 Eix del Llobregat, another name for the C-16 highway in Catalonia